Frank E. Thompson (July 2, 1895 – June 27, 1940) was a Major League Baseball third baseman who played with the St. Louis Browns in .

External links

1895 births
1940 deaths
Major League Baseball third basemen
Baseball players from Missouri
St. Louis Browns players
Cushing Refiners players